Duke Nicholas of Württemberg (1 March 1833 – 22 February 1903) was an officer in the army of the Austrian Empire.

Biography

Early life and family
Duke Nicholas was born at Carlsruhe, Kingdom of Prussia (now Pokój, Poland) was the third child of Duke Eugen of Württemberg (1788–1857, son of Duke Eugen of Württemberg and Princess Louise of Stolberg-Gedern) by his second marriage to Princess Helene of Hohenlohe-Langenburg (1807–1880, daughter of Charles Louis, Prince of Hohenlohe-Langenburg and Countess Amalie of Solms-Baruth). Nicholas had three half-siblings by his father's previous marriage with Princess Mathilde of Waldeck and Pyrmont.

Military career
After attending high school in Breslau and studied at Leibniz University Hannover. He was initially in the Austrian navy, and later in the Austrian Army. In 1860 he reached the rank of Major, in 1864 he participated in the Second Schleswig War and in 1866 at the Austro-Prussian War.

Then he traveled to Spain and North Africa. Since 1877, he was a Major General and Brigadier General in Krakow, in 1882 he stationed as a lieutenant and division commander in Komarno.

Marriage
On 8 May 1868, in Carlsruhe, he married Duchess Wilhelmine of Württemberg (1844–1892), daughter of Duke Eugen of Württemberg and Princess Mathilde of Schaumburg-Lippe. Wilhelmine was the elder daughter of Nicholas' half-brother. They had no issue.

Later life
Since 1888, Duke Nicholas lived in Carlsruhe (now Karlsruhe), where he operated as agriculture and forestry, and carried out studies on the fishing industry. As a member of the House of Württemberg in 1855 he had a seat in the Estates of Württemberg.

Nicholas died on 22 February 1903. At his death the third branch of the House of Württemberg (Carlsruhe) became extinct in the male line. His funeral took place on 27 February 1903. According to his will, Carlsruhe was passed to King William II, which he had from 1903 to his death in 1921, annually the King spent several weeks in hunting vacation at Carlsruhe. After The King's death Carlsruhe and the headship of the House of Württemberg went to Duke Albrecht (1865–1939).

Honours and awards
 :
 Grand Cross of the Order of the Württemberg Crown, 1847
 Grand Cross of the Friedrich Order
 Jubilee Medal
   Austria-Hungary:
 Grand Cross of the Royal Hungarian Order of Saint Stephen, 1896
 Military Jubilee Medal
 Service Award for Officers (50 years)
 : Knight of the Order of Saint Hubert, 1896
  Principality of Lippe: Cross of Honour of the House Order of Lippe, 1st Class with Swords
  Kingdom of Prussia:
 Knight of Honour of the Johanniter Order, 1890; Knight of Justice, 1892
 Knight of the Order of the Black Eagle, 18 January 1900
 : Knight of the Order of the Rue Crown, 1899

Ancestry

Notes and sources
The Royal House of Stuart, London, 1969, 1971, 1976, Addington, A. C., Reference: 223
L'Allemagne dynastique, Huberty, Giraud, Magdelaine, Reference: II 525

References

1833 births
1903 deaths
People from Namysłów County
People from the Province of Silesia
Dukes of Württemberg (titular)
Grand Crosses of the Order of Saint Stephen of Hungary
Non-inheriting heirs presumptive